The Little Mermaid (Malá mořská víla) is a 1976 Czech fantasy film directed by Karel Kachyňa based on the 1837 fairy tale of The Little Mermaid by Hans Christian Andersen. The film won the Main Prize at 1977 Gijón International Film Festival.

Cast
Miroslava Šafránková as Little Mermaid
Radovan Lukavský as King of the Seas
Petr Svojtka as Prince of South Realm
Libuše Šafránková as Princess of Neighbour Realm
Marie Rosůlková as Grandmother
Milena Dvorská as Witch
Jiří Ornest as Prince's aid
Dagmar Patrasová as Little Mermaid's sistere

External links

1976 films
Czechoslovak fantasy films
1970s Czech-language films
Films based on The Little Mermaid
Czech fantasy films
Films about witchcraft
1970s Czech films

Films about shapeshifting